The Wallenberg Foundations refers collectively to the 16 public and private foundations formed on the basis of donations from members of the Swedish Wallenberg family, or created with funds raised in honor of Wallenberg family members.

The Foundations award grants to excellent researchers and research projects whose purpose is for the benefit of Sweden. Over the past ten years the Foundations have awarded funding of just over SEK 17 billion. Total funding since the Foundations were established is approaching SEK 33 billion. The three largest foundations awarded SEK 2.2 billion in 2018. The emphasis of funding is on medicine, technology and natural sciences, but the Foundations also support social sciences, the humanities and archaeology.

Structure 
The three largest Foundations – Knut and Alice Wallenberg Foundation, Marianne and Marcus Wallenberg Foundation, and Marcus and Amalia Wallenberg Foundation jointly own FAM AB, an unlisted company whose purpose is to own and manage its direct holdings, and function as an active owner with a long-term commitment.

The three Foundations also have substantial holdings in the listed company Investor AB, which is a leading owner of international companies, most of them with Swedish roots.

Active engagement in these companies forms the basis for the Wallenberg family’s commitments, and it is this long-term involvement in the international operating companies that enables the Foundations to award funding of just over SEK 2.2 billion each year for Swedish research and education.

Dividends on the holdings are used to fund research and education grants.

Wallenberg family